Marian Richard Hess (November 21, 1941 in Polana, Bieszczady County, Poland – September 10, 2010 in Krefeld, Germany) was an ethnographer, sculptor, painter and enthusiast for local legends and traditions. Between 1968 and 1988 he lived and worked in Dwernik near Ustrzyki Dolne.

He created the regional legend of Bies and Czads. It was the inspiration of his later works. Around his house was an exhibition of sculptures, which both the scouts and tourists explored. Marian Hess told the visitors about the culture of the region.

In 1997 Hess and his wife Jozefa moved to Germany. In 2005 his first book Between dream and waking appeared. In 2007 the book was translated into German. Until his last days he lived in Krefeld in Westfalia and has been creating sculptures inspired by local legend of Gnoms and Kobolds.

After a long illness, he died in hospital in Krefeld on September 10, 2010.

Honors and awards 

 1984 - deserved an activist culture (Ministry of Culture and National Heritage)
 1997 - deserved of Bieszczady Mountains
 2004 (June) - awarded the city Duisburg - Silbernen Ulli-Umwelt-Ehren-Nadel

Publications 

 Who I am. Between dreaming and waking ...; Atut, 2005, 
 Wo lebt mein Herz: Ein Künstler in den polnischen Karpaten; Fiber Verlag, 2007,

References

1941 births
2010 deaths
People from Bieszczady County
Polish sculptors
Polish male sculptors
Recipient of the Meritorious Activist of Culture badge